Chintoo is a famous Marathi comic strip that appears in Sakal newspaper. Chintoo is written by Charuhas Pandit and Prabhakar Wadekar. For a couple of years it appeared in Loksatta. Chintoo (sometimes incorrectly spelled as Chintu) has been popular in all age groups since it started. It was first published on November 21, 1991.

Theme
Chintoo, the hero of the strip, represents a typical boy in middle class Marathi family. Normal incidents in his day-to-day life are given a humorous face in this cartoon series. He faces all the problems that other boys of his age face like pressure to study from parents, getting bullied etc. He also enjoys doing pranks. He gets fun out of simple things. He enjoys watching cricket, stealing mangoes from Joshi Kaku's trees. He loves to have pets, but his parents always refuse to let him have one.

Characters in the cartoon

Pappa
Chintoo's father. He is an engineer by profession.

Aai
Chintoo's mother is housewife. Her name is Deepa.

Ajji
Chintoo's grandmother is very loving and caring.

Ajoba
Chintoo's grandfather. Chintoo goes to his grandfather whenever he needs any toy who always fulfills Chintoo's demands.

Pappu
Chintoo's best friend. The boy who helps Chintoo when he is in danger. But then, Raju is a bigger danger than anybody can handle. Pappu is an animal lover and he especially likes puppies. He is very naughty as well.

Mini
A girl in the group. She loves going to school, exams and everything about studies. She is a poet at heart but nobody in the group likes her poems. Chintoo dislikes everything that Mini likes.
Chintoo quarrels with mini all the time.

Bagalya
A geek in the group. His name derives from his lanky frame, much like a stork. Baglya is kind of average Joe.

Raju
The bodily strong but mentally slow person in the group. Likes Mini's poems, but then that is not a praise. He does not understand jokes quickly, even if you make fun of him. So, if you are fast, you can crack jokes about him and get away. If he catches you, you are beaten. Chintoo loves making fun of Raju and keeps getting beaten by Raju.

Joshi Kaku
Chintoo's neighbor, who has a large garden full of fruit trees. Gets the brunt of the group's play, with their cricket resulting mostly in ball going through Joshikaku's glass windows, with predictable results.she loves Chintoo but she doesn't show that.

Joshi Kaka
Joshi Kaku's husband. Appears very rarely in the scene

Sonu
The small child in the group. He always faces troubles and everyone tries to rescue him. He is a typical boy with handkerchief tied to his shirt.

Banti
The doggy. He is Baglya's small brown-yellow colored pet dog. Chintoo always want to have a dog in his house like Bunty.

Neha
Another girl in the group. Appears very rarely in the scene.

Satish Dada
Chintoo's neighbour. Very filmy college going guy.

Android and iPhone Applications
Chintoo's Official mobile application has been released on Android and Apple app stores in April 2013.
iPhone Application Link: https://itunes.apple.com/us/app/chintoo/id634322377?mt=8
Android Application Link:https://play.google.com/store/apps/details?id=com.Charuhas_Pandit.chintoo

Books
Purandare Prakashan has published total 30 books before Sakal Prakashan.

Series of books published by Sakal Prakashan, are a collection of the comic strips of Chintoo published in Sakal Newspaper. There are total 14 volumes published till date and 6 more to be launched in 2013.

Film

On 18 May 2012, Indian Magic Eye Motion Pictures Pvt. Ltd. released the feature film version of the comic character and his gang. The film opened to a delightful response and was appreciated by a younger audience. The film, directed by Shrirang Godbole, has Shubhankar Atre playing the lead character of Chintoo. Actors like Subodh Bhave, Vibhawari Deshpande and others played the supporting characters. The film is the first Indian feature which has been adapted from a daily comic strip.

A sequel to the first film was released in 2013, titled Chintoo 2 – Khajinyachi Chittarkatha. The film had all the children characters played by the same actors as in the first film.

External links
Film Website
Chintoo website by Pan Ads, Pune
Sakal Newspaper (online edition)
Producers of Chintoo feature film
Loksatta Newspaper (online edition)

Indian comic strips